{{Infobox military unit
| unit_name                     = 28th Mechanized Brigade(2016present)

28th Guards Mechanized Brigade(20012016)

28th Guards Motor Rifle Division(19572001)

28th Guards Rifle Division(19421957)
| native_name                   = 
| image                         = 28 ОМБр к.svg
| image_size                    = 200
| caption                       = 28th Mechanized Brigade shoulder sleeve insignia
| dates                         = 1942present
| country                       = (1930s1991) (1991–1992)(1992present)
| allegiance                    = 
| branch                        = Ground Forces
| type                          = Mechanized Infantry
| role                          = 
| size                          = Brigade
| command_structure             = Operational Command South
| garrison                      = ChornomorskeOdesa Oblast, Ukraine
| motto                         = 
| march                         = 
| mascot                        = 
| patron                        = Knights of the First Winter Campaign.
| battles                       = * World War II
 War in Donbas
 2022 Russian invasion of Ukraine
 Southern Ukraine offensive
 Liberation of Kherson
Battle of Donbas
 Battle of Bakhmut
| anniversaries                 = 
| notable_commanders            = Vitaliy Gulyaev (2021-22)
| current_commander             = 
}}

The 28th Mechanized Brigade is a mechanized brigade and part of the formation of the Ukrainian Ground Forces.

 History 
The original 28th Guards Rifle Division was formed during the Second World War from the 180th Rifle Division in May 1942. The division fought at Kharkiv and Iași. It was with the 37th Army in Bulgaria in May 1945. During the 1980s, the then 28th Guards Motor Rifle Division was part of the 14th Guards Army headquartered at Chișinău, in the Moldavian SSR (Odesa Military District). After the fall of the Soviet Union it became part of the reorganised Ukrainian 6th Army Corps. After the 6th Army Corps was disbanded in 2013, the brigade became part of Operational Command South.

The brigade fought in the war in Donbas. On 22 August 2016, its Guards title was removed. On 22 August 2019 by decree of President Volodymyr Zelensky the official name of the brigade became: 28th Separate Mechanized Brigade named after the Knights of the First Winter Campaign.

The brigade is taking part in the defense of Ukraine during the 2022 Russian invasion of Ukraine, primarily in the South. According to the chairman of the Public Council at the Odesa Regional State Administration Serhiy Bratchuk, the Russians tried to plant a maritime and air landing in Kobleve on the Black Sea coast of the Mykolaiv area. As a result of the brigade, the Russians' attempt to plant a landing was stopped, and they enemy retreated, losing up to 25 soldiers. Two more saboteurs were detained in the village of Kobleve. On July 23, 2022, during the Russian invasion of Ukraine, the commander of the brigade Vitaliy Gulyaev was killed in Mykolaiv region. On the 12th of November, elements of the brigade were seen entering Kherson as part of the liberation of the city during the southern offensive.

Elements of the brigade are also present in the Battle of Bakhmut as of February 2023, with servicemen interviewed by CNN.

 Current Structure 
As of 2017 the brigade's structure was as follows:

 28th Mechanized Brigade''', Chornomorske
 Headquarters & Headquarters Company
 1st Mechanized Battalion
 2nd Mechanized Battalion
 3rd Mechanized Battalion
 Tank Battalion
 Brigade Artillery Group
 Headquarters & Target Acquisition Battery
 Self-propelled Artillery Battalion (2S3 Akatsiya)
 Self-propelled Artillery Battalion (2S1 Gvozdika)
 Rocket Artillery Battalion (BM-21 Grad)
 Anti-tank Artillery Battalion (MT-12 Rapira)
 Anti-Aircraft Missile Artillery Battalion
 Engineer Battalion
 Maintenance Battalion
 Logistic Battalion
 Reconnaissance Company
 Sniper Company
 Electronic Warfare Company
 Signal Company
 Radar Company
 CBRN-defense Company
 Medical Company

References

Mechanised infantry brigades of Ukraine
Military units and formations established in 2001
Military units and formations of Ukraine in the war in Donbas
Military units and formations of the 2022 Russian invasion of Ukraine